This is a list of administrators and governors of Lagos State. Lagos State was formed on 27 May 1967 from Colony province and Lagos federal territory. The Office of is responsible for the effective coordination of all government activities for Lagos State.

See also
Governors of the Lagos Colony (category)
Nigeria
States of Nigeria
List of state governors of Nigeria
Timeline of Lagos city
Oba of Lagos

References

External links
 Lagos State Government of Nigeria
 

Lagos
Lagos-related lists